Sagban (also Romanized as Sagbān; also known as Seyvan and Sīvān) is a village in Mishab-e Shomali Rural District, in the Central District of Marand County, East Azerbaijan Province, Iran. At the 2006 census, its population was 331, in 104 families.

References 

Populated places in Marand County